Andy Varipapa (March 31, 1891 – August 25, 1984) was a professional and trick bowler. He became famous around the world for his trick bowling shots.

Life and career
Varipapa was born Andrea Varipapa in Carfizzi, a small Arbëreshë comune in the Calabria region of Italy, the son of Francesco and Concetta (née Fuoco) Varipapa. After his father's death, he and his family moved to the United States, where they settled in Brooklyn, New York City.

Before becoming a professional bowler, he also played baseball, golf and had a try at a boxing career. He started his bowling career in the 1920s and soon made a reputation for himself in this sport, becoming one of the first pro bowlers in the country.

Varipapa was considered to be "the greatest one-man bowling show on Earth" because of his array of exhibition rolls, such as a "boomerang ball" that Varipapa would slowly roll down the lane, only to have it return. He was famous for his ability to convert splits and, astoundingly, could regularly convert the 7-10 split by rolling one ball from each hand, simultaneously. A film shows the balls crossing paths before meeting the pins. He made many demonstration short films over his career, including 1934's Strikes and Spares with Sally McKee and Buster Brodie.

Beyond his trick shot exhibitions, Varipapa was a solid professional bowler. In 1947, at the age of 56, he won the prestigious BPAA All-Star competition (predecessor to the U.S. Open) in a gruelling 100 game format, making him the oldest winner ever. He became the first to win two years in a row when he repeated in 1948 in spite of a dramatic comeback by Joe Wilman, who had won the All-Star in 1946. In 1949, Varipapa came close to a three-peat, finishing second to winner Connie Schwoegler of Madison, Wisconsin.

He was inducted into the USBC (United States Bowling Congress) Hall of Fame in 1957.

Varipapa lived to be 93 years old and was an active bowler well into old age. At the age of 78, he taught himself to bowl left-handed, as his right hand was giving him difficulties. Within two years he averaged 180, a testament to his skills and longevity.

The "Andy Varipapa 300" game was so-named after Andy joked that a string of 12 consecutive strikes spanning two games should count as a 300.

In 1950, he published the pamphlet Better Bowling, which was expanded two years later into Andy Varipapa's Quick Way to Better Bowling (Garden City Books).

Personal life
During his lifetime Varipapa was also known as "The Greek", a clear reference to his Arbëreshë ancestry.

Varipapa died on August 25, 1984, at the age of 93.

References
Bowlers Journal 2011 Year Review
PBA 1997 Press Guide

Official Website
https://andyvaripapa.com

1891 births
1984 deaths
American ten-pin bowling players
American people of Arbëreshë descent
Italian ten-pin bowling players
Italian people of Arbëreshë descent
Sportspeople from the Province of Crotone
Italian emigrants to the United States
Italian people of Albanian descent